Ingraham may refer to:

People
 Andrew Ingraham (1841–1905), philologist and schoolmaster
 Chrys Ingraham (born 1947), American sociologist
 Duncan Ingraham (1802–1891), officer in the United States Navy and Confederate States Navy
 Edward Sturgis Ingraham (1852–1926), first superintendent of the Seattle Public Schools and mountaineer
 Elizabeth Wright Ingraham (1922–2013), American architect and educator
 George Landon Ingraham (1847–1931), American lawyer and judge
 Hubert Ingraham (born 1947), second prime minister of the Bahamas
 Joseph Ingraham (1762–1800), American sailor and fur trader
 Joseph Holt Ingraham (1809–1860), American author
 Laura Ingraham (born 1963), American television and talk radio host
 Lloyd Ingraham (1874–1956), American actor and director
 Mary Ingraham (1901–1982), Bahamian suffragist
 Mary Shotwell Ingraham (1887–1981), American social reformer and founder of the United Service Organizations (USO)
 Pat Ingraham (born 1950), American politician
 Patricia Ingraham, Syracuse University professor
 Prentiss Ingraham (1843–1904), Confederate Army colonel and fiction writer
 William Moulton Ingraham (1870–1951), former mayor of Portland, Maine, and Assistant Secretary of War in 1917
 Ingraham Ebenezer Bill (1805–1891), Canadian author, journalist, and minister

Places in the United States
 Ingraham, Illinois, an unincorporated community
 Ingraham Township, Mills County, Iowa
 Ingraham Glacier, Washington
 Ingraham Hill, New York, a mountain
 Ingraham Lake, Florida

Other uses
 , United States Navy ships named for Duncan Ingraham
 Ingraham High School, Seattle, Washington, United States
 Ingraham Institute, a high school in Ghaziabad, Uttar Pradesh, India
 Ingraham Building, a commercial building in Miami, Florida, United States
 Ingraham Highway, name of part of Florida State Road 9336

See also

 William Ingraham Kip
 Ingram (disambiguation)
 Ingham (disambiguation)
 Engram (disambiguation)